Habibur Rahman Habib (Birth: 27 November 1972) is a Bangladeshi politician and the incumbent Member of Bangladesh Parliament from Sylhet-3.

Birth and early life 
Habibur Rahman Habib was born on 27 November 1972 in Kamalbazar village of Dakshin Surma upazila of Sylhet district. He passed BA from Sylhet MC College. He started living in the UK in 1995.

Career 
Habib was involved in BCL politics in 1986 when he was in eighth grade. He was the Acting General Secretary of the London Juba League and the Joint General Secretary of the United Kingdom Juba League. Habib served as a member of the United Kingdom Awami League and Secretary of Relief and Social Welfare. He is a member of Sylhet District Awami League.

He was elected to parliament from Sylhet-3 on 4 September 2021 in a by-election as a candidate of Awami League. He had received 90,064 votes while his nearest rival, Atiqur Rahman Atiq of Jatiya Party, received 65,312 votes. The election had a low turnout. The by-election were called after the death of incumbent and Awami League politician Mahmud Us Samad Chowdhury on 11 March 2021.

References

Living people
1972 births
Awami League politicians
People from Sylhet District
Murari Chand College alumni